Gotto is a surname. Notable people with the surname include:

Ainsley Gotto (1946–2018), Australian public servant and entrepreneur
Antonio Gotto, American cardiologist and academic administrator
Jim Gotto (born 1949), American politician
Lisa Gotto (born 1976), professor

See also
Votto (surname)